Nora St. Rose is a Trinidadian former cricketer who played as a right-arm medium-fast bowler. She appeared in two One Day Internationals for Trinidad and Tobago at the 1973 World Cup, and five Test matches for the West Indies in 1976. She also played domestic cricket for Trinidad and Tobago.

References

External links 
 
 

Living people
Date of birth missing (living people)
Year of birth missing (living people)
West Indian women cricketers
West Indies women Test cricketers
West Indies women One Day International cricketers
Trinidad and Tobago women cricketers